Wausau may refer to:

Places
 Wausau, Florida, town
 Wausau (town), Wisconsin, town
 Wausau, Wisconsin, city

Other uses 
 Wausau Daily Herald
 Wausau Downtown Airport, a city-owned public-use airport in Wausau, Wisconsin
 Wausau East High School, in Wausau, Wisconsin
 Wausau West High School, in Wausau, Wisconsin